The Czech Women's First League is the top level women's football league of the Czech Republic. The league is dominated by teams of Prague. Slavia Prague won the last championships, Sparta Prague was runner-up. The winning team, runners-up and third-place team of the league qualifies for the UEFA Women's Champions League.

History and format 
As Czechoslovakia dissolved in 1993, also the Czechoslovak women's football championships competitions were discontinued.

The I. liga started as a competition for 12 teams, each playing all other teams twice.

In 2002, the number of teams was reduced to ten and after the regular season was followed with a playoff with eight best teams. In 2006, the system was abandoned and a league of 12 teams was re-instated.

Since 2009-10, only eight teams participated in the league and after the regular season, a playoff system was held. In those two playoff groups, place 1 to 4 for the championship and the relegation group for teams placed between 5th and 8th positions. In 2010–11 nine teams played again only a double-round robin.

Participating teams in 2022–23

The following eight clubs are competing in the 2022–23 Czech Women's First League.

Champions 
The list of championships is dominated by Sparta Prague:

Regions
The following table lists the Czech women's football champions by region.

References

External links
 Official website
 fotbal.cz
 Czech women's football official website
 Information at eurofotbal.cz
 League at women.soccerway.com

  
Top level women's association football leagues in Europe
1
Professional sports leagues in the Czech Republic